Eupithecia furcata is a moth in the  family Geometridae. It is found in Iran and Turkey.

References

Moths described in 1879
furcata
Moths of the Middle East
Moths of Asia